Mekla District is a district of Tizi Ouzou Province, Algeria.

Notable people
 Essaïd Belkalem - Professional football player

Districts of Tizi Ouzou Province